Sergey Yakhnyuk (born 3 July 1962, Altynivka, Sumy Oblast) is a Russian political figure and a deputy of the 7th and 8th State Dumas.
 
From 1984 to 1989 he was the chief agronomist of the sovkhoz Pervomaisky in the Leningrad Oblast. In 1986-1989, he was the first secretary of the City Committee of the CPSU. From 1997 to 1999, he was the Deputy of the Legislative Assembly of Leningrad Oblast. On September 19, 1999, he was elected Head of Administration of the Priozersky District of the Leningrad Oblast. From 2007 to 2017, he worked at the administration of the Leningrad Oblast. On August 9, 2007, he was appointed Vice Governor of the Leningrad Oblast. In 2017, he was appointed Deputy of the 7th State Duma from the Leningrad Oblast constituency. Since September 2021, he has served as deputy of the 8th State Duma.

References
 

 

1962 births
Living people
United Russia politicians
21st-century Russian politicians
Eighth convocation members of the State Duma (Russian Federation)
Seventh convocation members of the State Duma (Russian Federation)